Jacob Michael Diebler (born October 28, 1986) is an American basketball coach and former player. Since 2019, he has served as an assistant coach at Ohio State.

He has previously served as an assistant at both Valparaiso and Vanderbilt under his college head coach and current Grand Canyon head coach Bryce Drew. He has also worked under former Ohio State head coach Thad Matta as a video coordinator in between his assistant coaching jobs at Valparaiso and Vanderbilt. He is known for being a good recruiter, being the primary recruiter for 5-star recruit and future Cleveland Cavaliers guard Darius Garland.

Early life and playing career

Diebler was born in and grew up in the town of Gibsonburg, Ohio. He went to Fostoria High School for his first three years of high school and played basketball under his father, Keith Diebler. He started playing with his younger brother Jon Diebler starting during his junior year. Before Jake's senior year of high school, Keith Diebler accepted the head coaching position at Upper Sandusky High School , so Jake and Jon went with Keith to play basketball at Upper Sandusky. During his high school career, he accumulated many accolades, including District player of the year in 2003, 2004, and 2005, second team All-State in 2003 and 2004, and the Ohio Division II co-player of the year in 2005, his senior season. He also led Upper Sandusky to win the State Championship and averaged 18.8 points in 2005.

After his senior year, he committed to Valparaiso to play basketball under coach Homer Drew. He played sparingly during his freshman season, only playing 18 games off the bench and averaging only 4.3 minutes per game and 1.1 points per game.His role increased dramatically during his sophomore year, when he started all 31 games for Valparaiso and averaged 32 minutes per game and 5.4 points per game. During his junior season, the team finished 22–14 and went to the 2008 College Basketball Invitational and advanced to the second round with the help of Diebler. Diebler started all 36 games, averaged 30.9 minutes per game and 7.5 points per game.During the offseason, he traveled to West Africa with Athletes in Action. He had his most productive season as a senior, starting every game for the third season in a row and averaging 33.8 minutes per game and 7.5 points per game.

Coaching career
During his childhood, Diebler did not want to become a coach like his father, saying that he “tried to deny being a coach probably because I saw my dad as a coach.” He decided to become a coach after his junior season, citing the impact that other coaches around him have had throughout his life: "I knew then, it just kind of hit me and I was encouraged there by the staff when I played," he said. "I had these huge aspirations to own my own business. That was where I felt like I wanted to be, but I had a heart change and here I am.”“At the end of the day, the most influential people in my life has always been coaches. That goes back to my dad, Homer Drew, Bryce Drew, Thad Matta. These people have had a profound impact on my life. I want to have that same impact on players. That's why I coach. That's my motivation for coaching. My life has been changed by coaches; I want to have the same impact on guys. I've been fortunate to have had access to that so far in my life."

Early coaching career
Diebler was first hired by his former college coach Homer Drew to be a student assistant with the team for the 2009–10 season. He was promoted to director of basketball operations for the 2010–11 season. The 2010–11 team won 23 games and was invited to the 2011 CIT tournament, where they lost to Iona in the first round.

He was promoted yet again to assistant coach for Valparaiso to fill the spot of Bryce Drew, who was promoted to head coach due to Homer Drew's retirement. The 2011–12 team finished 22–12, won the Horizon League regular season championship, and made it to the 2012 NIT tournament, marking the second time that Valparaiso had made the National Invitational Tournament. They lost in the first round to Miami (FL). In his second year as assistant coach during the 2012–13 season, Valparaiso went 26–8, won the Horizon League regular season championship for the second year in a row, and also were the 2013 Horizon League tournament champions. They made the NCAA tournament for the first time in 9 years, where they lost in the second round to 3-seed Michigan State
Diebler left Valparaiso before the 2013–14 season to accept a position as the video coordinator for Ohio State under head coach Thad Matta.  In his three years at Ohio State, they made 2 NCAA Tournaments while he was there and three winning seasons. He also trained professional basketball players like Aaron Craft, D'Angelo Russell, Evan Turner, Mike Conley, Jared Sullinger, Greg Oden, his brother Jon Diebler, Deshaun Thomas, Byron Mullins, and others.

Vanderbilt (assistant)
Diebler was hired away from Ohio State by Vanderbilt to serve as an assistant coach, reuniting with former Valparaiso head coach Bryce Drew. With the help of Diebler, the Commodores made the NCAA tournament, losing to Northwestern and finished with a 19–16 record. The next two seasons were losing seasons without postseason appearances, with records of 12–20 and 9–23. This decline of the program led to the coaching staff's firing at the end of the 2018–19 season. The one bright spot for Diebler during his time at Vanderbilt, however, was in his recruiting efforts. He was the primary recruiter for 5–star point guard Darius Garland, who committed to Vanderbilt on November 13, 2017.

Ohio State (assistant)

Diebler was hired back at Ohio State on April 17, 2019 to serve as an assistant coach under head coach Chris Holtmann, Thad Matta's replacement. With the addition of Diebler before 2019–20 season, Ohio State went  21–10 during the regular season before their first conference tournament game against Purdue was canceled along with the 2020 NCAA tournament was canceled due to the COVID-19 pandemic.

Personal life

Diebler's father, Keith, and his older brother, Jeremiah, are both high school basketball coaches in Ohio. Diebler and his wife, Jordyn, have two daughters, Jaymes and Jessa.

References

1986 births
Basketball coaches from Ohio
Sportspeople from Sandusky, Ohio
Living people
American men's basketball players
Valparaiso Beacons men's basketball players